Identity theory may refer to:

 Any of the theories of identity in philosophy
 Identity theory of mind, a philosophical term
 Pure identity theory, in logic
 Social identity theory, in the social sciences
 Cultural identity theory, in the social sciences
 Identity Theory (webzine), a literary website

See also
Identityism, is the school of Sufi metaphysics